Duchess Maria Isabella Philippine Theresia Mathilde Josephine of Württemberg (30 August 1871 – 24 May 1904) was a member of the House of Württemberg and a Duchess of Württemberg by birth and a member of the House of Wettin and a Princess of Saxony through her marriage to Prince Johann Georg of Saxony.

Family
Maria Isabella was the third child and youngest daughter of Duke Philipp of Württemberg and his wife Archduchess Maria Theresa of Austria.

Marriage
Maria Isabella married Prince Johann Georg of Saxony, sixth of eight children and the second son of George of Saxony, the penultimate king of Saxony, and his wife Infanta Maria Anna of Portugal, on 5 April 1894 in Stuttgart. Maria Isabella and Johann Georg did not have children.

Ancestry

References

1871 births
1904 deaths
People from Gmunden District
German Roman Catholics
House of Wettin
Saxon princesses
Duchesses of Württemberg
Burials at Dresden Cathedral